Betws or Bettws  may refer to:

Places
 Bettws, Bridgend, Wales
 Bettws, Newport, Wales
 Bettws Cedewain, Montgomeryshire, Powys, Wales
 Bettws Newydd, Monmouthshire, Wales
 Bettws-y-Crwyn, Shropshire, England
 Betws Bledrws, Llangybi, Ceredigion, Wales
 Betws Diserth, Radnorshire, Wales
 Betws Garmon, Gwynedd, Wales
 Betws Gwerfil Goch, Denbighshire, Wales
 Betws Ifan, Ceredigion, Wales
 Betws yn Rhos, Conwy, Wales
 Betws, Carmarthenshire, Wales
 Betws, Carmarthenshire (electoral ward)
 Betws-y-Coed, Conwy County Borough, Wales
 Capel Betws Lleucu, Cardiganshire, Wales
 Comins Capel Betws, a Site of Special Scientific Interest in Ceredigion, Wales

Sports teams
Bettws F.C., a football team in Bettws, Bridgend, Wales
Betws RFC, a rugby team in Betws, Carmarthenshire, Wales
Bettws RFC, a rugby team in Bettws, Newport, Wales